Aethalida quadrimaculata is a moth of the family Erebidae. It was described by George Talbot in 1929. It is found on Sulawesi in Indonesia.

References

Moths described in 1929
Spilosomina
Moths of Indonesia